Long Live the Queens! (aka The Platinum Collection) is the second compilation album by UK pop-rock project Shakespears Sister.

Background 
Long Live the Queens was released as part of Warner Bros. Records' Platinum Collection series, and thus is often referred to as such. As opposed to the greatest hits-oriented The Best of Shakespear's Sister, the album is compiled of rarities and unreleased tracks & mixes, many of which making their debut on CD. "Pretty Boy", for instance, was previously only released on a promotional 12" vinyl of "Break My Heart (You Really)".

Track listing

References 

Shakespears Sister albums
Albums produced by Flood (producer)
Albums produced by Alan Moulder
2005 remix albums
2005 compilation albums
B-side compilation albums
London Records remix albums
London Records compilation albums